The Ministry of Labour, Invalids and Social Affairs (MOLISA) is a government ministry in Vietnam responsible for state administration on labour, employment, occupational safety, social insurances and vocational training; policies for war invalids, martyrs and people with special contribution to the country; social protection and prevention of social evils; child care and gender equality.

Ministerial units
 Department of Labour and Wage
 Department of Social Insurance
 Department of Gender Equality
 Department of Legal Affairs
 Department of Planning and Finance
 Department of International Cooperation
 Department of Organisation and Personnel
 Ministry's Inspectorate
 Ministry's Office
 General Bureau of Vocational Training
 Bureau of Employment
 Bureau of Social Assistance
 Bureau of Overseas Labour
 Bureau of Work Safety
 Bureau of Social Evils Prevention and Combat
 Bureau of National Devotees
 Bureau of Child Care and Protection

Administrative units
 Institute of Labour Science and Social Affairs
 Institute of Orthopaedics & Rehabilitation
 Labour and Social Affairs Information Centre
 Labour and Society Newspaper
 Labour and Society Magazine
 Dan Tri online newspaper
 National Fund for Vietnamese Children

External links
 (VN) and (EN) Official site

Labour, Invalids and Social Affairs
Governmental office in Hanoi
Vietnam, Labour, Invalids and Social Affairs
Vietnam